Marc Levine (born April 26, 1974) is an American politician, who served in the California State Assembly representing the 10th district between 2012 and 2022. A member of the Democratic Party, Levine is the former Chairman of the California Legislative Jewish Caucus. A former member of the San Rafael City Council, Levine previously worked as a technology entrepreneur.

Levine was a candidate for California Insurance Commissioner in the 2022 election.

Early life, education, and career 
Marc Levine was born in Los Angeles, California. He graduated from California State University, Northridge with a bachelor's degree and went on to Naval Postgraduate School to earn his master's degree.

Before elected office, Levine worked as a senior product manager for Benetech, a social enterprise technology company, executive director of a web site promoting tsunami relief, and a business development strategy manager for a software company.

California State Assembly

Elections 
Levine served on the San Rafael City Council. Levine's election to the California State Assembly in 2012 was an upset. He was outspent five-to-one by a fellow Democrat, state Assemblyman Michael Allen. Levine was reelected in 2014 with 105,636 votes and received more votes than any other member of the State Assembly.

Tenure

Immigration 
Levine has stated: "Immigrants are welcome and we will do everything we can to help them achieve legal status." In 2015, authored two immigration bills— both of which were signed by Governor Brown.

AB 899 safeguards the privacy of immigrant children by requiring federal immigration officials to obtain a court order before accessing juvenile records. AB 900 helps unaccompanied minor immigrants who are escaping violence and exploitation to receive humanitarian relief through the Special Immigrant Juvenile Status visa process.

In 2014, Levine worked with legislative leaders and Governor Brown to pass legislation providing $3 million in legal aid for undocumented immigrants.

Personal life 
Levine is Jewish. He lives in Marin County with his wife Wendy and their two children.

Electoral history

2012 California State Assembly

2014 California State Assembly

2016 California State Assembly

2018 California State Assembly

2020 California State Assembly

References

External links 
 Campaign website
 Join California Marc Levine
 

1974 births
21st-century American Jews
21st-century American politicians
California State University, Northridge alumni
Jewish American state legislators in California
Living people
Democratic Party members of the California State Assembly
Naval Postgraduate School alumni
San Francisco Bay Area politicians